Cobridge Communications was a cable television, high-speed internet, and digital telephone service provider.

Coverage
Served parts of  Arkansas = Beebe, Hardy, Maumelle, McAlmont, Shannon Hills, Vilonia, West Pulaski  Alabama = Baileyton, Clanton, Columbiana, Double Springs, Elba, Elgin, Haleyville, Heflin, Henegar, Lay Lake, Leighton, Rainsville, Thorsby  Texas = Atlanta, Carthage, Colorado City, Levelland, Marshall, Portland, Sinton, Port Aransas, Lamar, Holiday Beach, Rockport, Fulton, Slaton  Missouri = El Dorado Springs,
Harrisonville, Nevada, Thayer, West Plains  Georgia = Lake Park  Louisiana = New Roads

Acquisitions
On October 22, 2010, Charter Communications announced completion of the sale of cable systems serving approximately 65,000 customers in seven states to Cobridge Communications, LLC. The 36 head ends acquired by Cobridge are located in Alabama, Arkansas, Georgia, Louisiana, Missouri, Ohio and Texas. As a result of this sale, Charter no longer operates in Arkansas and Ohio.

Fidelity Communications Merger

In May 2012, Cobridge had all of its markets bought by Fidelity Communications. All of the Cobridge customers went through a transition to Fidelity Communications and the Cobridge brand is now defunct.

References

Companies based in St. Louis County, Missouri
Economy of the Southeastern United States
Defunct companies based in Missouri
Defunct telecommunications companies of the United States